Jacob Omondi Ojee (born 7 March 1991) is a Kenyan rugby union wing who is currently a member of Kenya Commercial Bank RFC and is team captain for the Kenyan national rugby 7s team. Ojee began his interest in rugby at 13, and would accompany his older brother to workouts. He has been a member of the national rugby sevens team since 2014. Ojee has also appeared in tests for the Kenyan national rugby union team, with his first match coming against Portugal in 2015 and last coming against Namibia in 2018. Ojee was named captain of the rugby sevens team by head coach Paul Murunga on 16 January 2019.

References 

1991 births
Living people
Kenyan rugby union players
Kenyan rugby sevens players
Rugby sevens players at the 2020 Summer Olympics
Olympic rugby sevens players of Kenya
Rugby union wings
Simbas players